Chongxin is a county in the southeast of Gansu province, China, located  northeast of Pingliang, which administers it. It borders Pingliang, Jinchuan County, to the east, Huating County to the west, and Long County to the south, which is part of Baoji, Shaanxi province.

Chongxin was established in 963 AD, its name being derived from 尊崇信任 (Zūnchóng xìnrèn), meaning 'respect and trust'. It has a population of 104,800. More than 80% of the population rely on farming, and have very poor living conditions. The government or municipality offices are mainly located in Jinping Town.

Administrative divisions
Chongxin County is divided to 1 Subdistrict, 4 towns and 2 townships.
Subdistricts
 Chengshishequ

Towns
 Jinping
 Xinyao 
-Towns are upgraded from Township.
 Baishu - it is renamed from Baishu Towns.
 Huangzhai

Townships
 Huanghua Township
 Mulin Township
-Former Townships are merged to other.
 Jiugong Township
 Tongcheng Township

Climate

Education
No.1 Chongxin County High School was the only high school to some extent in this county before 2000. 

Daxing Primary School, as of 2016, has 40 students in multi-grade classrooms and five teachers, none of whom have university degrees. All of the teachers were men in their 50s.

References

External links
  Official website of Chongxin County

County-level divisions of Gansu
Pingliang